Robert Peyton may refer to:

 Robert Ludwell Yates Peyton (1822-1863), U.S. politician, soldier, and lawyer
 Bob Peyton (born 1964), English footballer
 Sir Robert Peyton of Isleham (died 1518), founder of the line of Peyton baronets
 Sir Robert Peyton (Middlesex MP), Knight of the Shire of Middlesex 1679-1685
Robert Peyton (MP died 1550), MP for Cambridgeshire
Robert Peyton (MP died 1590), MP for Cambridgeshire
Lee Frederick, American actor frequently credited as Robert Peyton